Sir Ernest Hyam Davis  (17 February 1872 – 16 September 1962) was a New Zealand businessman, and was Mayor of Auckland City from 1935 to 1941. He was also on other Auckland local bodies (Fire Board, Hospital Board, Drainage Board) and on various philanthropic and sporting organisations. He was Mayor of Newmarket (a small inner-Auckland borough) from 1909 to 1910.

Early life
Davis was born on 17 February 1872 in Nelson to brewer Moss Davis and Leah Davis. He attended Bishop's School in Nelson, and Auckland Grammar. On 2 August 1899, he married Marion Mitchell, who had made a career as an opera singer with her debut at age 14.

Career
Davis joined the brewing industry with W Macarthur & Co, and later became managing director of Hancock & Co. In 1923, New Zealand Breweries was formed. He was a brewery baron for half a century, and a master tactician against the Prohibition movement. His brother, Eliot Davis, was also in brewing.

During the 1912 Waihi miners' strike, the strike leaders were imprisoned. They were released in November for securities of £1600, which was put up by Davis. He was a major source of funds for the Labour Party, and was Michael Joseph Savage's employer for most of the period 1908–1919. He also employed John A. Lee to manage the Palace Hotel in Rotorua from 1929 to 1931 after Lee lost his seat in Parliament.

The historian and polictial scientist Barry Gustafson has described Davis as "a millionaire who from 1912 until his death was a very generous financial supporter of the Labour Party ... A ruthless businessman, benefactor of worthy causes, and with an eye for the opposite sex."

Conservatives tend to look after the more affluent in the country and do not care if the worker has sixpence for a beer or not."

In 1935, Davis was elected Mayor of Auckland with Citizens' Committee endorsement, narrowly defeating Labour's candidate Joe Sayegh by only 400 votes. He greatly increased his majority when re-elected in 1938.

Davis was the owner of the Grand Hotel Auckland from 1910, when his parents retired to London, until his death. He collected a large number of Victorian paintings, which hung in the hotel until its closure in 1966 when it was leased by Hancock & Co. Ltd from the Ara Masonic Lodge. Davis was also a racehorse owner and yachtsman.

Honours and awards 
In the 1937 Coronation Honours, Davis was knighted as a Knight Bachelor. He was appointed a Chevalier of the Légion d’honneur by the Republic of France on 2 April 1938 for his services to the French Navy during their visits to Auckland. His award was announced by the French Foreign Minister and recognised the never-failing courtesy and entertainment of French naval crews during visits to Auckland, most notably the cruiser Jeanne d’Arc, which had visited only two months previous. In 1953, he was awarded the Queen Elizabeth II Coronation Medal.

In 2010, Davis was posthumously inducted into the New Zealand Business Hall of Fame.

Notes

References

 

1872 births
1962 deaths
People educated at Auckland Grammar School
Mayors of Auckland
Jewish New Zealand politicians
Businesspeople from Auckland
People from Nelson, New Zealand
Chevaliers of the Légion d'honneur
New Zealand recipients of the Légion d'honneur
New Zealand Knights Bachelor
Businesspeople awarded knighthoods